Lucas Arnold and Paul Hanley were the defending champions, but did not participate together this year.  Arnold partnered Martín García, losing in the semifinals.  Hanley partnered Jim Thomas, winning the title.

Hanley and Thomas defeated Oliver Marach and Cyril Suk 6–3, 4–6, [10–5] in the final.

Seeds

Draw

Draw

External links
Draw

Hypo Group Tennis International
2006 ATP Tour